Christopher Knights is an English voice actor, film editor, and cinematographer. He is best known for providing the voice of Private the Penguin in the Madagascar film franchise. He worked on several DreamWorks films Shrek, Shrek 2, Shrek the Third and Shrek 4-D.  He started his filming career at Amblimation studios and worked on We're Back! A Dinosaur's Story and Balto. When he joined DreamWorks he not only started his editing career but also his acting career. He worked on the Shrek series as an associate editor and voice of the Three Blind Mice and Thelonious, Lord Farquaad's Henchman. He worked many times with another English cameraman and voice actor, Simon J. Smith.

Filmography

Actor
Rumble (2021) (voice) .... King Gorge's Coach
Penguins of Madagascar (2014) (voice) .... Private the Penguin
Madly Madagascar (2013) (voice) .... Private the Penguin
Madagascar 3: Europe's Most Wanted (2012) (voice) .... Private the Penguin
Shrek Forever After (2010) (voice) .... Three Blind Mice
Merry Madagascar (2009) (voice) .... Private the Penguin
Madagascar: Escape 2 Africa (2008) (voice) .... Private the Penguin (credited as "Chris Knights")
Shrek the Third (2007) (voice) .... Blind Mice / Heckler / Evil Tree #2 / Guard #2
Flushed Away (2006) (voice) .... Fat Barry the Rat / Market Trader
The Madagascar Penguins in a Christmas Caper (2005) (voice) .... Private the Penguin (credited as "Chris Knights")
Madagascar (2005) (VG) (voice) .... Private the Penguin / Pedistain (credited as "Chris Knights")
Shrek 2 (2004) (VG) (voice) .... Three Blind Mice (With Simon J Smith)
Shrek 2 (2004) (voice) .... Three Blind Mice (with Simon J Smith)
Shrek 3-D (2003) (voice) .... Thelonious / Blind Mouse (with Simon J Smith)
Shrek (2001) (voice) .... Blind Mouse / Thelonious (with Simon J Smith)
Shrek in the Swamp Karaoke Dance Party (2001) (V) (singing voice) .... Thelonious / Blind Mouse (with Simon J Smith)

Editorial department
Spirit Untamed (2021) (associate editor) (With C.K. Horness)
Megamind (2010) (associate editor)
Shrek Forever After (2010) (associate editor)
Shrek the Third (2007) (associate editor)
Madagascar (2005) (first assistant editor)
Shrek 2 (2004) (assistant editor) (With Simon J Smith)
Shrek 4-D (2003) (additional editor) (With Simon J Smith)
Shrek (2001) (first assistant film editor) (With Simon J Smith)

Camera and electrical department
The Prince of Egypt (1998) (camera operator)
Balto (1995) (camera operator: rostrum camera)
We're Back! A Dinosaur's Story (1993) (camera operator: rostrum camera)

Animation department
We're Back! A Dinosaur's Story (1993) (line tester as Chris Knights)

External links 
 

Living people
DreamWorks Animation people
English cinematographers
English film editors
English male film actors
English male voice actors
People from London
Year of birth missing (living people)